Dongdaegu Station, meaning "East Daegu Station", is a railway station in Daegu, South Korea.

History

The station opened in 1962 and KTX trains on the Gyeongbu Line began services on April 1, 2004, shortly after the completion of the new building earlier that year.

Services
Dongdaegu has become the chief station for Daegu, surpassing Daegu Station.

Overground
Dongdaegu Station serves all KTX trains on the Gyeongbu Line. It also has express services and local services on the normal speed Gyeongbu Line. The station is served by the Daegu Line, a short line which connects to the Jungang Line.

Subway
The station also serves the Daegu Subway. The overground railway and subway stations are not connected directly: the Subway Line 1 station entrance lies in a park close by the railway station.

Popular culture 
Dongdaegu station features in the 2016 zombie horror film Train to Busan.

See also
 Transportation in South Korea
 Korail
 KTX

References

External links
Korea Train eXpress
Route Map
Station homepage (Korean)
 Cyber station information from Daegu Metropolitan Transit Corporation

Korea Train Express stations
Railway stations in Daegu
Daegu Metro stations
Dong District, Daegu
Railway stations opened in 1962